Vasyl Baranov (born 20 October 1979) is a retired Ukrainian professional footballer. He played midfielder for clubs in the Ukraine, Belarus and Estonia.

Baranov began his playing career in the Ukrainian league, and played for clubs including FC Zorya Luhansk, FC Dnepr Mogilev, FC Smorgon and FC Pärnu Vaprus.

External links

Profile at KLISF
 Player profile on www.soccernet.ee

1979 births
Living people
Footballers from Luhansk
Ukrainian footballers
FC Zorya Luhansk players
FC Dnepr Mogilev players
FC Smorgon players
Pärnu JK Vaprus players
Expatriate footballers in Belarus
Expatriate footballers in Estonia
Ukrainian expatriate footballers
Association football midfielders
Ukrainian expatriate sportspeople in Estonia
Ukrainian expatriate sportspeople in Belarus